Acronis Cyber Protect Home Office (previously known as Acronis True Image) is a software package produced by Acronis International GmbH that aims to protect the system from ransomware and allows users to backup and restore files or entire systems from a backup archive, which was previously created using the software. Since 2020, Acronis Cyber Protect Home Office includes malware and Zoom protection (though the ability to use such features depends on the subscription purchased). The software is used by technicians to deploy operating systems to computers and by academics to help restore computers following analysis of how viruses infect computers.

Features

Backup 
Acronis can create two types of backup archives: (1) file backups (which consist of user-specified files and directories (but not the metadata of the disk or partition)) and (2) full system images (which consist of files, directories and disk metadata). The software can create full disk backup archives of several file systems including: NTFS (Windows); FAT32 (Windows 9x and removable media); Macintoish systems (HFS+ and APFS) and Linux systems (ext2, ext3, ext4; ReiserFS, and Linux Swap). Acronis falls back to using sector-by-sector copy when a non-supported filesystem is backed up. Acronis has an agent that can be installed within the operating system, which allows backups to be performed in the background while the computer is being used.

Local backup 
Acronis can back up a computer, selected disks or selected files to a local location specified by the user. The software can perform full, differential and incremental backups. Full creates a new backup archive every time and backs up everything specified by the user. Differential backups only backup the changes made since the latest full backup and incremental only backs up the changes made since the last incremental backup. Incremental backups are a chain and loss of any one of the incremental backups renders the entire backup useless. Prior to Acronis True Image 2020, incremental backups were stored individually in separate tib files which made them difficult to manage.  Since 2020, Acronis stores backups in a single archive file with a tibx extension.

Cloud backup (subscription users only) 
Users can specify to store their backup archives in Acronis's data centers around the globe. Users who subscribe to the software for a year rather than buying a copy of the software receive cloud storage which can be used to store cloud-based backups. As of 2019, premium users receive 1 terabyte of cloud space.

Recovery and restoration 
Acronis Cyber Protect Home Office allows users to restore files from a full disk or a file-based archive using either a preinstallation media with Acronis on it or from within the user interface of the program. If protected system files are restored (e.g. restoring an entire system to an earlier state), the system restarts to perform the recovery operation.

Users may also mount a backup archive, which allows users to browse the contents of the archive in a manner similar to browsing any other disk drive.

Disk cloning 
The software can clone the contents from one physical storage device (e.g. SSD, HDD or NVMe) to another drive. The drive does not need to be formatted before data can be cloned to it and may be smaller in size than the source disk but the amount of space on the disk must be at least the size of the amount of data being cloned. Cloning aims to preserve the disk metadata. For example, disk cloning is useful for installing a larger disk in a computer or replacing a hard disk drive with a solid state drive. Crucial recommends using a preinstallation media of Acronis to perform the clone to avoid possible cloning failures due to partitions being inaccessible.

Some hard disk manufacturers including Western Digital, Intel and Seagate provide customized variants of Acronis True Image with their drives that allows the user to clone their existing disk to another disk, typically of the same manufacturer.

Reverting changes 
Acronis allows users to protect selected disk drives from unintended changes and revert them if the change is undesired. This can be used instead of virtual machines to create stable and secure environments that can be quickly reverted from within the software.

Limitations

Possible incompatibility between versions 
Prior to Acronis True Image 2020, the backup archives were stored using a proprietary format with a .tib file extension on Windows systems. Due to this, compatibility is not guaranteed between products that are not within the same version. Older versions of the software cannot read backup archives created using a newer version.

Unwanted advertisements 
One limitation of the software is the inability to disable taskbar popups marketing upgrades and new products from the developer. The notification will grab focus (i.e. will interrupt a full screen game or movie) and each advertisement must be disabled individually.  The company currently offers no way to permanently turn off these advertisements.

Backup management 
Managing backup archives created using the Acronis Cyber Protect Home Office software can be challenging for expert users who want to use it in conjunction with other software to manage their backups. For example, the software does not recognize when backups have been deleted using external software.

Uses

Use in academia 
Acronis is used by cybersecurity researchers to conduct analysis of computer viruses because it is faster than using alternative techniques such as virtualization.

Use by technicians 
Acronis is used by computer technicians to deploy a common system image to a group of computers. For example, the preinstallation media of Acronis allows the user create full disk backup archives of a given system without needing to install the agent on the system being cloned.

History 
Acronis began in 2001 as a division of SWsoft and in 2003 became a separate company and continued to release the Acronis True Image software. The True Image name was applied to all platforms from Home to Corporate until 2010, when Acronis business backup software was renamed, with True Image being the home version. In 2020, security features were integrated into the product and Acronis argued that a name change was necessary to reflect these changes.

Acronis True Image (2003–2021) 
Prior to Acronis True Image 9, their business-focused product Acronis Backup or Acronis Cyber Protect shared the same name as their home product with the minor exception that the business versions were called Acronis True Image Server. Later server backup software was renamed "Acronis Backup".

Versions 
The table summarizes the key changes between versions of Acronis.

Similar products 
Acronis also produce a series of similar backup solutions for businesses including:

 Acronis Cyber Protect (previously called Acronis Backup and Acronis True Image Server)
 Acronis Cyber Cloud

See also 
 Comparison of disk cloning software
 Disk cloning

References

Backup software
Proprietary cross-platform software
Disk cloning